Philip Franks (born 2 February 1956) is an English actor and director, known to the public chiefly for his roles in English television series, such as The Darling Buds of May and Heartbeat.

Early life
Franks was born on 2 February 1956 in London and is the only child of Patricia and Robert Franks. His father was a squadron leader pilot in the Royal Air Force. Franks maintains that he first fell in love with theatre at age six, when his parents took him along to see a production of The Tempest. The following year, his parents were going to a production of Hamlet,  and Franks insisted on going with them; at age seven, he was hooked for life.

Career
Franks is best known for his role as the tax inspector Cedric "Charley" Charlton in the English comedy drama The Darling Buds of May, and also as Sgt. Raymond Craddock in Heartbeat. He has also been a guest star  in Absolutely Fabulous, Pie in the Sky, Midsomer Murders, Foyle's War, Bleak House, Martin Chuzzlewit, The Buddha of Suburbia, The Green Man and To Serve Them All My Days. For the role of his character in Martin Chuzzlewit (Tom Pinch), Franks shaved off all of the hair on his head leaving wispy strands at the sides. When he was recognized in the street by fans they asked if he had done it for religious reasons.

He also made regular appearances alongside Susie Dent in the 'Dictionary Corner' on the British quiz show Countdown (having applied to be a contestant on the show before becoming better known) until 2006. From December 2012 Franks played The Narrator in the 40th anniversary UK touring production of Richard O'Brien's Rocky Horror Show.

Franks is also a member of the Royal Shakespeare Company. In addition, he has directed many plays including "Kafka's Dick" and "The Kiss of the Spiderwoman" (Nottingham Playhouse); "The Cocktail Party" (Edinburgh Festival); "Rebecca" (Royal Lyceum, Edinburgh); "Hamlet" (Greenwich and tour); "Macbeth" (Sheffield Crucible) and "The Duchess of Malfi" (West Yorkshire Playhouse, Greenwich and West End); "Private Lives" and "The Heiress" (Royal National Theatre); "The White Devil" (Lyric Theatre, Hammersmith); "Nicholas Nickleby" (Chichester Festival Theatre); and "The Tempest" (Liverpool Playhouse).

He has also directed many BBC Radio dramas including "A Patriot For Me" by John Osborne starring Richard Goulding, Peter Egan, Amanda Root, Michael Pennington. BBC Radio 3. 

Franks also directed "A Cold Supper Behind Harrods" by David Morley which starred David Jason, Anton Lesser, Stephanie Cole, and Sophie Roberts. When three former Special Operations Executive agents are reunited in 1997 their meeting forces them to look at their own conduct during World War Two. The story was inspired by real events. Anton Lesser played code maker Leo Marks and Stephanie Cole played Vera Atkins.

References

External links 
 

1956 births
Alumni of Mansfield College, Oxford
English male television actors
English theatre directors
Living people
People educated at Haileybury and Imperial Service College
Royal Shakespeare Company members